Abdul Malik Kasi was a Pakistani physician and former caretaker minister. He was the Minister of Railways in Khoso caretaker ministry in 2013 and Minister for Health in Soomro caretaker ministry in 2008. He was a child specialist (pediatrician) and had his own medical center. He died after a prolonged illness in Quetta city on 14 August 2021.

References

Living people
Federal ministers of Pakistan
Pakistani medical doctors
Year of birth missing (living people)